Job Kurian (born 29 July 1982) is an Indian singer composer/Play back singer who has a mark in Independent stream and is a part of the Indian Film industry, mainly in the Malayalam language. He is the front man of his live act 'Job Kurian Live'. He is known for his smooth high-pitched voice.

Personal life 
Job Kurian was born in Thiruvananthapuram, Kerala. He attended St Shantal, Christ Nagar and Bharatiya Vidhya Bhavan for schooling. Prithviraj Sukumaran was his batchmate during his school days.

He pursued his BTech at Malanad College of Engineering, Karnataka. Job's family consists of his father, mother, two sisters and his wife Athira and their sons.

Career 
Job Kurian is known for his smooth high-pitched voice. He has been prevalent in the Malayalam Playback Industry and independent music scene of Kerala for the past 13 years, maintaining a high reputation. The TV shows such as straight from the heart, Music Mojo (3 seasons), Thalam (album), hope project, along with more than 40 tracks in the Malayalam Film industry and his energetic live concerts have earned him the reputation he still holds in the hearts of all the music lovers in Kerala.

Job Kurian works with a regular set of wonderful co-artists who has a great rapport with him, both personally and musically, and travels together frequently in India and Abroad, further strengthening the bond, giving the audience an impeccable and mesmerizing experience, the name of his live act is 'Job Kurian Live'. Job has featured along with a lot of popular bands like Avial, Shankar Tucker Band and so on, sharing beautiful chemistry with such legendary artists on and off stage.

Awards 
Manorama Music Awards

 2018 – Best Independent Musician 

Indywood Music Awards

 2018 – Best Independent Music project – Hope Project

Filmography

Discography

External links 
 Job Kurian on IMDB

References 

1982 births
Living people
21st-century Indian male singers
21st-century Indian singers
Malayalam playback singers